Ronald Beitler (born 25 July 1977) is a Dutch Grand Prix motorcycle racer.

Career statistics

Grand Prix motorcycle racing

By season

Races by year

References

1977 births
Living people
Dutch motorcycle racers
250cc World Championship riders
21st-century Dutch people